BK Grodno-93 is a basketball club based in Grodno, Belarus that plays in the Premier League.

Trophies
Premier League: 8
1996, 1998, 1999, 2000, 2001, 2002, 2003, 2004

External links
Team profile on Eurobasket.com
Official website 

Basketball teams in Belarus
Basketball teams established in 1933
1933 establishments in Belarus